The city of Kantchari is located in eastern Burkina Faso near the border with Niger and on the main road from Ouagadougou to Niamey. Kantchari is home to approximately 5,000 people.

Populated places in the Est Region (Burkina Faso)